Norwell High School is a public high school located approximately 4 miles southwest of Ossian, Indiana.

About
Norwell High School opened in the fall of 1967 after a consolidation between Ossian and Lancaster Central High Schools. The first graduating class, the Class of 1968 was separated between the two schools while construction was completed on the current campus. The Class of 1969 was the first to graduate from the school at its current location. The school serves the entire Northern Wells Community Schools school district. The school district is located in the northern part of Wells County, running from IN 124 north. Norwell High School is centrally located in the school district at US 224 and county road 100 E. Norwell has a strong athletic background in participation in the Northeast Eight (NE8). Norwell High School currently operates on a traditional 7 period system.

Athletics 
The Knights were the IHSAA 3A baseball state championshipions in 2003, 2007, and 2013.

Notable alumni
Chandler Harnish, professional football player, quarterback for Northern Illinois, MVP of 2010 Humanitarian Bowl, "Mr. Irrelevant" in 2012 NFL Draft
Matt Kinzer, professional baseball player, MLB St. Louis Cardinals, professional football player, NFL Detroit Lions
Jarrod Parker, professional baseball player, MLB Oakland Athletics
David Rupel, television producer and writer
Josh VanMeter, professional baseball player, MLB Arizona Diamondbacks

See also
 List of high schools in Indiana

References

External links
 

Public high schools in Indiana
Education in Wells County, Indiana
1967 establishments in Indiana